Valentino el argentino is a Spanish-language telenovela produced by Pol-ka Producciones and Vista Producciones filmed between Argentina and Colombia. It premiered on El Trece in Argentina on 7 October 2008, followed by its debut on RCN Televisión in Colombia on 27 October 2008. The series was created by Juana Uribe and Adrián Suar for the respective television channels in Argentina and Colombia, and it stars Julián Román, and Segundo Cernadas as the title character's.

It is considered one of the five Colombian productions most hated by the public. On the other hand, the telenovela was only on the air for three days on RCN Televisión, and was subsequently taken off the air due to its low reception by the public.

Cast 
 Julián Román as Valentino
 Liliana González as Margarita
 Segundo Cernadas as Alter ego
 Ana Lucía Domínguez as Claudia
 Luly Bossa as Teresa
 Pablo Alarcón as Marcos
 Alejo Correa as Felipe Contreras
 Héctor Calori as Modestio
 Matías Santoianni as Omar
 Víctor Mallarino as Dr. Correa
 Alejandro Fiore as Chanfarella
 Adriana Salgueiro as Tete
 Diego Díaz as Cristian
 Gisela Van Lacke as Fernanda
 Carolina Eugenia Márquez as Paty
 Luz Cipriota as Anahí
 Santiago de Jesús Díaz as Robinson
 Cristina Alberó as Lidia
 Irene Goldszer as Dulce
 Salvatore Cassandro as Marmol
 Santiago Ramundo as Marcelo

References

External links 
 

2008 telenovelas
Argentine telenovelas
Colombian telenovelas
2008 Colombian television series debuts
2008 Colombian television series endings
2008 Argentine television series debuts
2009 Argentine television series endings
RCN Televisión telenovelas
El Trece telenovelas
Spanish-language telenovelas
Spanish-language television shows